James O'Sullivan was an Irish 20th century Anglican bishop.

Born in 1834  he was educated at Trinity College, Dublin and ordained  in 1858. He was Rector of Rahoon and then of St Nicholas, Galway. From 1888 he was Archdeacon of Tuam and then, from 1890, the 57th Bishop of Tuam, the 56th Bishop of Killala and the 57th of Achonry. He died in post on 10 January 1915.

References

1834 births
1915 deaths
Alumni of Trinity College Dublin
20th-century Anglican bishops in Ireland
Bishops of Tuam, Killala, and Achonry
Archdeacons of Tuam